Naughty Baby is a 1928 American silent comedy film directed by Mervyn LeRoy and starring Alice White and Jack Mulhall. It was released on December 16, 1928, by First National Pictures.

Plot
Rosalind McGill (White) is a cloak room girl. She falls for a rich boy (Mulhall), who may not actually be rich.

Cast
Alice White as Rosalind McGill
Jack Mulhall as Terry Vandeveer
Thelma Todd as Bonnie Le Vonne
Doris Dawson as Polly
James Ford as Terry's pal
Natalie Joyce as Goldie Torres
Frances Hamilton as Bonnie's pal
Fred Kelsey as Dugan
Rose Dione as Madame Fleurette
Fanny Midgley as Mary Ellen Toolen
Larry Banthim as Toolen
Georgie Stone as Tony Caponi
Benny Rubin as Benny Cohen
Andy Devine as Joe Cassidy
Raymond Turner as Terry's valet

Preservation
The film was considered a lost film, with only the Vitaphone soundtrack still in existence. However, a print of Naughty Baby was discovered at the Museum of Modern Art film archive in 2017.

References

External links

Naughty Baby at silentera.com

1928 films
1928 romantic comedy films
American black-and-white films
American romantic comedy films
American silent feature films
First National Pictures films
1920s rediscovered films
Films directed by Mervyn LeRoy
1920s English-language films
Rediscovered American films
Films with screenplays by Garrett Fort
1920s American films
Silent romantic comedy films
Silent American comedy films